Peppermint Rose was a line of dolls made by Mattel and American Greetings in 1992. It also inspired an animated half-hour television special that was made in 1992, aired syndicated and released on video.

Characters 
 Peppermint Rose - Leader of the group, dressed in pink and white. 
 Miss Vanilla Daisy - Brunette, dressed in white with assorted colors. 
 Lemon Kiss Lily - Light brown haired girl in violet and lily-colored dress.
 Merry Mint Violet - African-American girl in deep purple and green dress.

Candy Blossoms 
Large rabbit-like creatures with huge ears and flowers on their heads, they were sold as plush 'teddy bears.'
Lollipop Posey
Bubblegum Violet

Sweet Spray 
Much like the Candy Blossoms but sold as little figurines. 
Peppermint Posy
Bubbly

Doll brands
Mattel
1990s toys